Jan-Erik Maas (also known as Jan Maas) is an animator.

He won a 2017 Annie Award in Outstanding Achievement, Character Animation in a Feature Production for his work on the film Kubo and the Two Strings.

Selected filmography
 Kubo and the Two Strings (2016)

References

External links

Living people
Annie Award winners
Year of birth missing (living people)